Hibbins is a surname. Notable people with the surname include:

Ann Hibbins (died 1656), American woman executed for witchcraft
Frederick Hibbins (1890–1969), British long-distance runner
Geoff Hibbins (1929–2018), Australian rules footballer
Sam Hibbins (born 1982), Australian politician